Dattaram Deu Naique Desai (11 September 1930 – unknown) was an Indian politician, underground worker and freedom fighter from Goa. He was a former member of the Goa, Daman and Diu Legislative Assembly, representing the Quepem Assembly constituency from 1963 to 1967. He was also a member of the Azad Gomantak Dal.

Early life and education
Dattaram Deu Desai was born to Deu B. Desai in Cuncolim, Goa. He completed his Secondary School Certificate.

Career
Desai contested in the 1963 Goa, Daman and Diu Legislative Assembly election from the Quepem Assembly constituency on the Maharashtrawadi Gomantak Party (MGP) ticket and emerged victorious, he served for five years from 1963 to 1967.

He later quit the party prior to the elections and unsuccessfully contested as an Independent candidate in the 1967 Goa, Daman and Diu Legislative Assembly election from the same constituency, he lost to MGP candidate, Shaba Desai by a margin of 2887 votes. This marked Desai's last election participation in his political career.

Role in Goa's freedom struggle (1954–1958)
In 1954, Desai joined the Azad Gomantak Dal where he worked as an underground worker. On 13 April 1955, Desai along with his associates attacked the Cuncolim police station and captured all arms and ammunition from the armoury, he almost got himself arrested on 30 June 1956 but managed to flee away.

In July 1958, Desai took part in the Daman Union Territory attacks. He also accompanied the Indian Army battalion from Majali, Karnataka to Margao city during the liberation of Goa.

Awards
Desai was awarded the Tamrapatra by the Government of India in 1973.

Legacy
On 18 January 2014, the Cuncolim Municipal Council (CMC) named the Sanvorcotto road in Desai's honor, followed by five other freedom fighters.

Positions held
 Member of Block Advisory Committee of the Community Development Blocks, 1964

Notes

References

1930 births
Year of death uncertain
Indian politicians
People from South Goa district
Maharashtrawadi Gomantak Party politicians
20th-century Indian politicians